Harry Lewis Benson (22 January 1883 – 1953) was an English footballer who played for Stoke, Northampton Town and Port Vale.

Career
Benson played for non-league Shelton Albion and Porthill, before joining local the Football League side Stoke in 1901. It took him three seasons before he could become a regular under Horace Austerberry; he took over from the injured Charlie Burgess in 1904–05, making 27 appearances. He partnered Burgess in 1905–06 with the pair missing only five games between them. He played six matches in 1906–07 as Stoke were relegated from the First Division, and then departed the Victoria Ground. Benson then moved to Southern League side Northampton Town. He then moved onto the newly reformed Port Vale in December 1908. His first game was against the reserve outfit of Stoke, Vale's rivals and Benson's old club; Vale lost 2–1. He was their first choice left-back between December 1908 and December 1910, but was released in 1911 with 43 North Staffs League appearances to his name.

Career statistics
Source:

References

Footballers from Stoke-on-Trent
English footballers
Association football fullbacks
Stoke City F.C. players
Northampton Town F.C. players
Port Vale F.C. players
English Football League players
Southern Football League players
1883 births
1953 deaths